Round Trip is the 12th album by the Gap Band, released on November 14, 1989 on Capitol and EMI Records. The album includes the singles "All of My Love" (which hit number one on the American R&B chart) and "Addicted to Your Love".

Track listing

Charts

Weekly charts

Year-end charts

References

External links
 Round Trip at Discogs

1989 albums
The Gap Band albums
Total Experience Records albums
Capitol Records albums